Shane Henry (born March 15, 1970) is a Canadian retired ice hockey center and left wing who was an All-American for Massachusetts–Lowell.

Career
Henry arrived in Lowell, Massachusetts after a successful junior career that saw him score more than 2 points per game in his final season. Neither the Chiefs nor Henry had much success in his freshman season with Lowell finishing 7th in Hockey East. After the year, head coach Bill Riley Jr. was forced to resign in the midst of a NCAA investigation that saw the program put on probation for two years. The first year under new bench boss Bruce Crowder saw very little difference, but the team saw vast improvements in year two. Henry blossomed in his junior season, doubling his scoring production and leading the team in all three offensive categories. He was awarded the Len Ceglarski Award for sportsmanship by recording just 6 penalties on the year and 11 through three seasons of play. He was named team captain for his senior season and, with Massachusetts Lowell now off probation, he was able to lead the team to its second NCAA tournament at the Division I level. While his goal production was halved, the Chiefs still won 25 games and finished second in their conference. Henry was named to the second All-American team and got his team to its best finish since joining D-I in 1983.

After graduating, he began playing professionally with the Richmond Renegades and helped the club win the Riley Cup that season. Despite some impressive scoring numbers, he played just 2 games at the AAA level before being consigned to the lower levels of pro hockey. He spent much of the 1997 season in England with the Solihull Blaze and then retired following an unimpressive 16-game stint with the Pee Dee Pride.

Henry was inducted into the Massachusetts Lowell athletic Hall of Fame in 2009.

Statistics

Regular season and playoffs

Awards and honors

References

External links

1970 births
Living people
AHCA Division I men's ice hockey All-Americans
Canadian ice hockey centres
Canadian ice hockey left wingers
Ice hockey people from Vancouver
UMass Lowell River Hawks men's ice hockey players
Richmond Renegades players
Cleveland Lumberjacks players
Tallahassee Tiger Sharks players
Waco Wizards players
Coventry Blaze players
Pee Dee Pride players